Burcu Köksal (born 18 January 1980) is a Turkish politician from the Republican People's Party (CHP), who has served as a Member of Parliament for Afyonkarahisar since 7 June 2015.

Early life and career
Burcu Köksal was born on 18 January 1980 to a family of teachers in Afyonkarahisar. She completed her primary and secondary education in Afyonkarahisar and graduated from Istanbul University Faculty of Law. She has been a lawyer in Afyonkarahisar since 8 March 2004.

Political career
Koksal served as President of the Republican People's Party (CHP) Afyonkarahisar Women's Branch in 2007. Köksal contested CHP preselection for the June 2015 general election, she beat incumbent CHP MP Ahmet Toptaş for the first place list position, and was subsequently elected as the lone CHP Member of Parliament for Afyonkarahisar. She was narrowly re-elected in the snap November 2015 elections.

Köksal was one of 15 CHP deputies to join the Good Party on 21 April 2018 in order to make the party eligible to contest the 2018 election. She retained first place on the CHP party list for Afyonkarahisar in the 2018 Elections and was re-elected.

She was a member of the Turkish Grand National Assembly Presidency Council for the first half of the 27th Parliament of Turkey

See also
25th Parliament of Turkey

References

External links
 MP profile on the Grand National Assembly website
 Collection of all relevant news items at Haberler.com

Contemporary Republican People's Party (Turkey) politicians
Good Party politicians
Deputies of Afyonkarahisar
Members of the 25th Parliament of Turkey
Living people
People from Afyonkarahisar
1980 births
Members of the 26th Parliament of Turkey
Istanbul University Faculty of Law alumni